Imperial Parliament may refer to: 
During the British Empire, the Parliament of the United Kingdom
The Imperial Council of Austria
The General Assembly of the Ottoman Empire